Redemptive Violence  is defined as "the belief that violence is a useful mechanism for control and order" or alternately "using violence to rid and save the world from evil". The French Revolution involved violence that was depicted as redemptive by revolutionaries, while decolonization theorist Frantz Fanon was an advocate of redemptive violence. Pacifism rejects the idea that violence can be redemptive.

The Myth Of Redemptive Violence:

the Myth of Redemptive Violence is the story of the victory of order over chaos by means of violence. It is the ideology of conquest, the original religion of the status quo. The gods favour those who conquer. Conversely, whoever conquers must have the favour of the gods.

References

Further reading

Violence